John Chapman may refer to:

Politicians

United Kingdom
John Chapman (Leicester MP) represented Leicester (UK Parliament constituency)
Sir John Chapman, 2nd Baronet (c. 1710–1781), British Member of Parliament for Taunton, 1741–1747
John Chapman (Grimsby MP) (1810–1877), British Member of Parliament for Grimsby, 1862–1865 and 1874–1877

United States
John Chapman (Pennsylvania politician) (1740–1800), United States Representative from Pennsylvania
John Grant Chapman (1798–1856), Maryland politician
John Lee Chapman (1811–1880), American politician
John William Chapman (1894–1978), Lieutenant Governor of Illinois

Other countries
John Otho Chapman (1931–2011), politician in Saskatchewan, Canada
John Chapman (Australian politician) (1879–1931), Australian senator

Writers
John Chapman (theologian) (1704–1784), English cleric and scholar
John Chapman (engineer) (1801–1854), English political and economic writer
John Jay Chapman (1862–1933), American essayist and dramatist
John Chapman (screenwriter) (1927–2001), English playwright and screenwriter

Sportspeople
Jack Chapman (1843–1916), baseball player and manager
Jack Chapman (footballer) (1895–?), English footballer
John Chapman (baseball) (1899–1953), former shortstop
John Chapman (cricketer, born 1877) (1877–1956), English cricketer
John Chapman (cricketer, born 1814) (1814–1896), English cricketer
John Chapman (New Zealand cricketer) (1865–1949), New Zealand cricketer
John Chapman (football manager) (1882–1948), footballer and manager
Johnny Chapman (born 1967), NASCAR driver
John Chapman (rugby league), Australian rugby league player
John Chapman (harness racing) (1928–1980), Canadian driver

Religion 
John Wilbur Chapman (1859–1918), American Presbyterian evangelist
John Chapman (priest) (1865–1933), British priest, abbot, and religious scholar
John Chapman (evangelist) (1930–2012), Australian evangelist
John Chapman (bishop), Anglican bishop in Canada

Other people 
Johnny Appleseed (John Chapman, 1774–1845), pioneer nurseryman and missionary
John Gadsby Chapman (1808–1889), American artist
John Chapman (publisher) (1821–1894), publisher of the Westminster Review
John Ratcliffe Chapman (1815–1899), British-American rifle scope designer
John Chapman (Medal of Honor) (1844–1905), French soldier who fought in the American Civil War
John Henry Chapman (1860–1942), British businessman and philatelist
John Chapman (Australian Army officer) (1896–1963), Australian Army general of WWII
John Herbert Chapman (1921–1979), Canadian space researcher
John Chapman (artist) (born 1946), British artist
John Norman Chapman (born 1947), American murderer
John A. Chapman (1965–2002), USAF Combat Controller, posthumously awarded the Medal of Honor
John Chapman (producer), British television producer

See also
Jonathan Chapman (1807–1848), American politician